Linda Miller may refer to:
 Linda Miller (politician) (born 1947), member of the Iowa House of Representatives
 Linda Lael Miller (born 1949), American romance novelist
 Linda Miller (actress) (born 1942), American film and television actress
 Taylor Miller (Linda Taylor Miller, born 1953), American soap opera actress
 Linda Miller (engineer), American civil engineer
 Linda Miller (rower) (born 1972), American Olympic rower
 Linda Hess Miller, American photographer
 Linda Jo Miller, Actress known for King Kong Escapes